Crenichthys is a genus of fish in the subfamily Empetrichthyinae which is part of the family Goodeidae, the splitfins. This small genus consists of two species which are both endemic to Nevada in the United States. They occur in small populations in isolated warm springs. Fish of this genus are known commonly as springfish.

Distinctive characteristics include the loss of the pelvic fins, a relatively large anal fin and one or two rows of black spots along each side.

Species
The two recognized species in this genus:
 Crenichthys baileyi (C. H. Gilbert, 1893)
 Crenichthys baileyi albivallis J. E. Williams & G. R. Wilde, 1981 – Preston White River springfish
 Crenichthys baileyi baileyi (C. H. Gilbert, 1893) – White River springfish
 Crenichthys baileyi grandis J. E. Williams & G. R. Wilde, 1981 – Hiko White River springfish
 Crenichthys baileyi moapae J. E. Williams & G. R. Wilde, 1981 – Moapa White River springfish
 Crenichthys baileyi thermophilus J. E. Williams & G. R. Wilde, 1981 – Mormon White River springfish
 Crenichthys nevadae C. L. Hubbs, 1932 – Railroad Valley springfish

References 

 
Empetrichthyinae
Freshwater fish genera
Taxa named by Carl Leavitt Hubbs
Ray-finned fish genera